El with hook (Ԓ ԓ; italics: Ԓ ԓ) is a letter of the Cyrillic script. Its form is derived from the Cyrillic letter El (Л л) by adding a hook to the bottom of the right leg.

El with hook was officially added to the Chukchi alphabet in the late 1980s. The letter was first used in a Chukchi language primer that was published in 1996, replacing the Cyrillic letter  to reduce confusion with the different pronunciation of the Russian letter of the same form.

El with descender (Ԯ ԯ) is the nineteenth letter of the Itelmen, introduced with the new Cyrillic alphabet during 1984-1988. In some publications El with hook is substituted by El with descender.

El with hook has been in use in the Khanty since 1990. El with hook and El with descender are considered variants of the same letter in Khanty, their use depends on the particular publisher.

Computing codes

Variant forms

The letter has two variant forms: the original one where the hook is like a small comma, and the other where the hook is notably protruded below the baseline.

See also
Ԯ ԯ : Cyrillic letter El with descender
Ӆ ӆ : Cyrillic letter El with tail
Ԡ ԡ : Cyrillic letter El with middle hook
Cyrillic characters in Unicode

References 

Cyrillic letters with diacritics
Letters with hook